"It's All About U" is a song by SWV, released on November 12, 1996 as the third single from their second album, New Beginning (1996). The song was written and produced by Allen "Allstar" Gordon. The song found all three members taking lead, but Taj took predominant lead as opposed to Coko.

Critical reception
A reviewer from Music Week rated the song three out of five, adding, "Sounding at times like a mid-Sixties Smokey Robinson given a Nineties swingbeat feel, this attractively combines a raw, funky production with soulful vocals."

Music video
The song's music video was filmed at the Museum of Science and Industry in Tampa, Florida, and was directed by Kevin Bray.

Track listing
US Single
 It's All About U (LP Version) 	3:43 	
 It's All About U (Instrumental) 	3:48 	
 It's All About U (A Cappella) 	3:47 	

UK CD 1
 It's All About U (Radio Edit) 		
 It's All About U (Bounce Baby Bounce Remix) 		
 It's All About U (All Funked Up Remix) 		
 Anything (Old Skool Radio Version)

UK CD 2
 It's All About U (Radio Edit) 	3:46 	
 Use Your Heart (Rappers Delight Remix) 	3:05 	
 Use Your Heart (Duet Featuring Rome) 	4:38 	
 You're The One (Special Mix With Hook & Rappers From The Remixes) 	4:53

UK Cassette
 It's All About U (Radio Edit) 3:46
 You're The One (Special Mix With Hook & Rappers From The Remixes) 	4:53

Europe CD
 It's All About U (LP Version) 	3:43 	
 It's All About U (Fast Car Mix) 	4:47 	
 It's All About U (Allstar Mix) 	4:14 	
 It's All About U (Drumapella) 	4:41

Charts

Release history

References

1996 singles
Music videos directed by Kevin Bray (director)
RCA Records singles
SWV songs
1996 songs
Songs written by Andrea Martin (musician)